Interior Design Masters with Alan Carr (also known as Interior Design Masters) is a British reality competition television series with series four currently airing on BBC One, from Tuesday 7 March 2023 for eight weeks and series five already commissioned for 2024.

Premise
The competition pits 10 amateur interior designers against each other for a chance to win a commercial contract. Each week, a different challenge is set, designed to test their ability to meet various client briefs in different commercial and residential settings. Across the series, the contenders redesign commercial spaces, from shops to restaurants and salons.

Interior Design Masters was hosted by presenter Fearne Cotton for one series in 2019, and then from 2021 Alan Carr and judged by former Elle Decoration editor-in-chief Michelle Ogundehin. Michelle is joined by a rotating panel of guest judges, dependent on the weekly brief, such as interior stylist Laurence Llewelyn-Bowen, retail expert Mary Portas and home designer Jade Jagger.

Series One

Contestants

Contestant progress

 The contestant won Interior Design Masters.
 The contestant was the runner-up of Interior Design Masters.
 The contestant received the most positive critiques of the week or making part of winning team.
 The contestant received positive judges' critiques but was ultimately declared safe.
 The contestant received judges' critiques but was ultimately declared safe.
 The contestant received negative judges' critiques but was ultimately declared safe.
 The contestant was on the bottom for that week.
 The contestant was eliminated.

Series Two
Series two returned to BBC Two on Tuesday 2 February 2021, with new presenter Alan Carr and returning series judge Michelle Ogundehin. With 10 new contestants for an eight episode series and week one guest judge was Laurence Llewelyn-Bowen.

Contestants

Contestant progress 

 The contestant won Interior Design Masters.
 The contestant was the runner-up of Interior Design Masters.
 The contestant received the most positive critiques of the week or making part of winning team.
 The contestant received positive judges' critiques but was ultimately declared safe.
 The contestant received judges' critiques but was ultimately declared safe.
 The contestant received negative judges' critiques but was ultimately declared safe.
 The contestant was on the bottom for that week.
 The contestant was eliminated.

Series Three
A third series took place with Alan Carr as presenter, Michelle Ogundehin returning as Head Judge, with guest judges such as Laurence Llewelyn-Bowen and Mary Portas returning throughout the series. The series returned on Wednesday 9 March 2022 at 9pm on BBC One.

Contestants

Contestant progress 

 The contestant won Interior Design Masters.
 The contestant was the runner-up of Interior Design Masters.
 The contestant received the most positive critiques of the week or making part of winning team.
 The contestant received positive judges' critiques but was ultimately declared safe.
 The contestant received judges' critiques but was ultimately declared safe.
 The contestant received negative judges' critiques but was ultimately declared safe.
 The contestant was on the bottom for that week.
 The contestant was eliminated.

Series Four
It was confirmed on 23 February that series four will return to BBC One on Tuesday 7 March 2023.

Contestants

Contestant progress 

 The contestant won Interior Design Masters.
 The contestant was the runner-up of Interior Design Masters.
 The contestant received the most positive critiques of the week or making part of winning team.
 The contestant received positive judges' critiques but was ultimately declared safe.
 The contestant received judges' critiques but was ultimately declared safe.
 The contestant received negative judges' critiques but was ultimately declared safe.
 The contestant was on the bottom for that week.
 The contestant was eliminated.

Series Five
It was announced on Monday 6 February 2023 that applications for Series five were now open, with applications to close by 30 April 2023.

References

External links
 
 

BBC reality television shows
Reality competition television series
2019 British television series debuts
2010s British game shows
2020s British game shows
English-language television shows
Television series by Banijay